Harbans Lal (born 11 April 1938) is an Indian long-distance runner. He competed in the marathon at the 1964 Summer Olympics.

References

External links
 

1938 births
Living people
Athletes (track and field) at the 1964 Summer Olympics
Indian male long-distance runners
Indian male marathon runners
Olympic athletes of India
Place of birth missing (living people)